Annakurban Amanklychev is a human rights activist notable for serving a prison sentence (2006-2013) in the dictatorial regime of Turkmenistan on charges, widely believed to be fabricated. Amnesty International had considered him a prisoner of conscience and named him a 2011 "priority case".

Arrest and trial
Annakurban Amanklychev is associated with Turkmenistan Helsinki Foundation (THF), an organization that publicized human rights violations in Turkmenistan. In June 2006, he was arrested along with Sapardurdy Khadzhiev, another THF worker, and Khadzhiev's sister Ogulsapar Myradowa, a correspondent for Radio Liberty. The three were initially charged with spying for foreign intelligence services; These charges were later changed to "the illegal acquisition, possession or sale of ammunition or firearms." Amanklychev's family allege that law enforcement planted cartridges in his car to manufacture evidence. Amnesty International, Front Line, Reporters Without Borders, and Human Rights Watch have all described the charges as fabricated.

Imprisonment
Annakurban Amanklychev and Sapardurdy Khadzhiev were sentenced to seven-year prison terms. Ogulsapar Muradova was sentenced to six years but died two weeks into her sentence; her children reported that one of her legs was broken, her arms bore evidence of injections, and marks on her body indicated she had been strangled. Reporters Without Borders believes Amanklychev and Khadziev to currently be located in a high-security prison in Turkmenbashi known for poor conditions: "the region is extremely hot in the summer and bitterly cold in the winter, and inmates are forced to do agricultural work in such conditions... the inmates spend their time in filthy, overcrowded cells with no access to drinking water. The quality of what little food they receive is poor."

On 11 December 2010, the United Nations Working Group on Arbitrary Detention called for the immediate  release of Amanklychev and Khadziev, stating that their detention was a violation of international law.

Release
Amanklychev and Khadziev were released from prison on 16 February 2013, after nearly seven years imprisonment.

References

Year of birth missing (living people)
Living people
Amnesty International prisoners of conscience held by Turkmenistan
Turkmenistan journalists
Turkmenistan prisoners and detainees
Turkmenistan human rights activists
Imprisoned journalists
21st-century Turkmenistan writers
Censorship in Turkmenistan